Limnaecia xanthotyla is a moth in the family Cosmopterigidae. It is found on the Solomon Islands.

References

Natural History Museum Lepidoptera generic names catalog

Limnaecia
Moths described in 1930
Taxa named by Edward Meyrick
Moths of the Solomon islands